Philyaw is a surname. Notable people with the surname include:

Charles Philyaw (born 1954), American football player
Deesha Philyaw, American author, columnist, and public speaker
Dino Philyaw (born 1970), American football player
Mareno Philyaw (born 1977), American football player
Raymond Philyaw (born 1974), American football player